Meisha Ross Porter (born November 18, 1973) is an American educator who served as the New York City Schools Chancellor in 2021.

Biography 
Meisha Ross Porter was born in Far Rockaway and raised in Jamaica, Queens. She graduated from Queens Vocational and Technical High School before enrolling in Hunter College. Porter received her Bachelor of Arts degree in English, concentrating in Cross Cultural Literature and Black and Puerto Rican Studies.

She started her career as a youth organizer in the Bronx. She was involved with the foundation of the Bronx School for Law, Government and Justice (BLGJ). She worked at BLGJ for a total of 18 years, variously as a community associate, a teacher, an assistant principal, and ultimately as the principal.

Ross Porter was appointed Superintendent of District 11 in 2015, where she served for less than three years. District 11 includes neighborhoods that span the Northeast Bronx. In 2018, she was appointed Bronx Executive Superintendent, overseeing 361 schools with 235,000 students in that borough.

New York City Mayor Bill de Blasio announced that Porter was his pick for schools chancellor on February 26, 2021. The then chancellor, Richard Carranza, was stepping down. Porter is New York City's first Black woman chancellor. 

Ross Porter has continued her education through her career. She received her Master’s Degree in Administration and Supervision from Mercy College and completed her School District Leader certification through the NYC Advanced Leadership Institute (Center for Integrated Teacher Education - CITE). She is currently pursuing a doctorate in education at Fordham University.

A recipient of the National Association of Negro Women’s Sojourner Truth Award, Porter has been a Columbia University Cahn fellow and an Aspen Institute fellow. She has taught at CUNY as an adjunct professor and participated in the Harvard University National Institute for Urban School Leaders and is a member of the Fordham University – Carnegie Foundation iLead team.

References 

1974 births
Living people
New York City School Chancellors
Fordham University alumni
African-American educators